Muhammad Khorsedur Rahman Khan, also known as Khursed Alam, was an Indian politician and teacher. He was the second MLA for Rajabala constituency at the Meghalaya Legislative Assembly.

Life
Khan was born into a Bengali Muslim family in the village of Kasaripara in the Hallidayganj, Garo Hills of Meghalaya. Despite being an Indian National Congress candidate, he lost against Mozibur Rahman at the 1978 Meghalaya Legislative Assembly election for Rajabala constituency. However, he defeated his rival at the 1983 Meghalaya Legislative Assembly election.

References

Indian National Congress politicians from Meghalaya
Meghalaya MLAs 1983–1988
Year of birth missing
20th-century Bengalis
People from West Garo Hills district
20th-century Indian Muslims
Indian Sunni Muslims